Ebonics (a portmanteau of the words ebony and phonics) is a term that was originally intended to refer to the language of all people descended from African slaves, particularly in West Africa, the Caribbean, and North America. The term Ebonics was created in 1973 by a group of black scholars who disapproved of the negative terms being used to describe this type of language. Since the 1996 controversy over its use by the Oakland School Board, the term Ebonics has primarily been used to refer to the sociolect African-American English, a dialect distinctively different from Standard American English.

Original usage
The word Ebonics was originally coined in 1973 by African American social psychologist Robert Williams in a discussion with linguist Ernie Smith (as well as other language scholars and researchers) that took place in a conference on "Cognitive and Language Development of the Black Child", held in St. Louis, Missouri.  His intention was to give a name to the language of African Americans that acknowledged the linguistic consequence of the slave trade and avoided the negative connotations of other terms like "nonstandard Negro English":
We need to define what we speak. We need to give a clear definition to our language...We know that ebony means black and that phonics refers to speech sounds or the science of sounds. Thus, we are really talking about the science of black speech sounds or language.
In 1975, the term appeared in Ebonics: The True Language of Black Folks,  a book edited and cowritten by Williams:

A two-year-old term created by a group of black scholars, Ebonics may be defined as "the linguistic and paralinguistic features which on a concentric continuum represent the communicative competence of the West African, Caribbean, and United States slave descendants of African origin. It includes the various idioms, patois, argots, idiolects, and social dialects of black people" especially those who have adapted to colonial circumstances. Ebonics derives its form from ebony (black) and phonics (sound, the study of sound) and refers to the study of the language of black people in all its cultural uniqueness.

Other writers have since emphasized how the term represents a view of the language of Black people as African rather than European. The term was not obviously popular, even among those who agreed with the reason for coining it. Even within Williams' book, the term Black English is far more commonly used than the term Ebonics.

John Baugh has stated that the term Ebonics is used in four ways by its Afrocentric proponents. It may:
1. Be "an international construct, including the linguistic consequences of the African slave trade";
2. Refer to the languages of the African diaspora as a whole;
or it may refer to what is normally regarded as a variety of 
3. It "is the equivalent of black English and is considered to be a dialect of English" (and thus merely an alternative term for African American English), or
4. It "is the antonym of black English and is considered to be a language other than English" (and thus a rejection of the notion of "African American English" but nevertheless a term for what others refer to by this term, viewed as an independent language and not a mere ethnolect).

Common usage and controversy

Ebonics remained a little-known term until 1996. It does not appear in the 1989 second edition of the Oxford English Dictionary, nor was it adopted by linguists.

The term became widely known in the United States due to a controversy over a decision by the Oakland School Board to denote and recognize the primary language (or sociolect or ethnolect) of African-American youths attending school, and to thereby acquire budgeted funds to facilitate the teaching of standard English. Thereafter, the term Ebonics became popularized, though as little more than a synonym for African American English, perhaps differing in the emphasis on its claimed African roots and independence from English. The term is linked with the nationally-discussed controversy over the decision by the Oakland School Board, which adopted a resolution to teach children "standard American English" through a specific program of respect for students' home language and tutoring in the "code switching" required to use both standard English and Ebonics.

While the term is generally avoided by most linguists, it is used elsewhere (such as on Internet message boards), often for ridiculing AAE, particularly when this is parodied as drastically differing from Standard American English. African American linguist John McWhorter argues that the use of the term does more to hinder black academic achievement than to help it, in that considering AAE to be a completely different language from English serves only to widen the perceived divide between whites and blacks in the United States. Walt Wolfram, a long-time researcher into AAE, points out that discussion of this variety of English "gets politicized and trivialized by the very term Ebonics."

See also

 African American Vernacular English
 Code-switching
 Cubonics
 Dialects of North American English
 Hebronics
 Multicultural London English
 Southern American English
 Stereotypes of African Americans

Notes

References

External links

 Writings on the "Ebonics" issue, by John R. Rickford
 Baugh, John. "American varieties: African American English: Ebony + Phonics". PBS, 2005.
You're Wrong About podcast "The 'Ebonics' Controversy" (61 minutes) 4 April 2019 podcast website Apple podcasts

African-American English
1970s neologisms